SEUM: Speedrunners from Hell is an independent video game developed by Pine Studio and published by Headup Games. It was released for Microsoft Windows, macOS, and Linux via Steam in July 2016, for Xbox One in September 2017, for PlayStation 4 in February and March 2018, and for GOG.com in October 2018. It is a first-person platformer where you race against time using a variety of power-ups, inspired by speedrunning sessions in games like Quake or Super Meat Boy. The name "SEUM" was derived from ColloSEUM, the working title of the game.

On October 20, 2017, it got its first DLC titled "The Drunk Side of the Moon".

Gameplay
SEUM is a first person platform game where the player controls Marty, a man who goes into hell to retrieve beer that was stolen by a demon, the player can cast fireballs that can light up a lantern and activate objects. A beer is hidden in every level, if a player finds one they get the option to restart or exit. If the player dies, they have to restart the level. Players attempt to reach the end of a level in a certain time, while avoiding fireballs, saws, bombs, swinging blades and others, if players are fast enough they get an Uber Skull. Some levels have power-ups with special abilities:

 Gravity
 Teleport
 Rewind
 Spawn platform
 Roar (DLC)
 Rocket (DLC)
 Shadow world (DLC)

Players can navigate each level by elevator, There are 9 floors in the game.
Levels in each floor can be played in any order, but a certain amount of levels need to be completed to play the boss level, which can unlock the next floor. Finding all the beers in each floor can unlock a bonus level which replaces beer with bacon. There are a total of 11 level in each floor.

Story

Reception
The game received mixed to positive reviews. It currently holds an aggregated score of 77/100 on Metacritic for Xbox One.

References

External links
Official webpage
Steam Store Page

2016 video games
Platform games
Speedrunning
Windows games
Linux games
MacOS games
PlayStation 4 games
Xbox One games
Video games developed in Croatia
Headup Games games
Single-player video games